The technocracy movement was a social movement active in the United States and Canada in the 1930s which favored technocracy as a system of government over representative democracy and concomitant partisan politics. Historians associate the movement with engineer Howard Scott's Technical Alliance and Technocracy Incorporated, prior to the internal factionalism that dissolved the latter organization during the Second World War. Technocracy was ultimately overshadowed by other proposals for dealing with the crisis of the Great Depression. The technocracy movement proposed replacing partisan politicians and business people with scientists and engineers who had the technical expertise to manage the economy. But the movement did not fully aspire to scientocracy.

The movement was committed to abstaining from all partisan politics and communist revolution. It gained strength in the 1930s but in 1940, due to opposition to the Second World War, was banned in Canada. The ban was lifted in 1943 when it was apparent that 'Technocracy Inc. was committed to the war effort, proposing a program of total conscription.' The movement continued to expand during the remainder of the war and new sections were formed in Ontario and the Maritime Provinces.

Smaller groups included the Technical Alliance, The New Machine and the Utopian Society of America.

Overview
Technocracy advocates contended that price system-based forms of government and economy are structurally incapable of effective action, and promoted a society headed by technical experts, which they argued would be more rational and productive.

The coming of the Great Depression ushered in radically different ideas of social engineering, culminating in reforms introduced by the New Deal. By late 1932, various groups across the United States were calling themselves technocrats and proposing reforms.

By the mid-1930s, interest in the technocracy movement was declining. Some historians have attributed the decline of the technocracy movement to the rise of Roosevelt's New Deal. Historian William E. Akin rejects the conclusion that Technocracy ideas declined because of the attractiveness of Roosevelt and the New Deal. Instead Akin argues that the movement declined in the mid-1930s as a result of the technocrats' failure to devise a 'viable political theory for achieving change' (p. 111 Technocracy and the American Dream: The Technocrat Movement, 1900–1941 by William E. Akin). Akin postulates that many technocrats remained vocal and dissatisfied and often sympathetic to anti-New Deal third party efforts.

One of the most widely circulated images in Technocracy Inc.’s promotional materials, for instance, used the example of a streetcar to argue that design solutions will always succeed where legislation or fines fail. If passengers insist on riding on the car’s dangerous outer platform, leaders need only design cars without platforms. Problem solved.

Origins
The technocratic movement has its origins with the progressive engineers of the early twentieth century and the writings of Edward Bellamy,  along with some of the later works of Thorstein Veblen such as Engineers And The Price System written in 1921.  William H. Smyth, a California engineer, invented the word technocracy in 1919 to describe "the rule of the people made effective through the agency of their servants, the scientists and engineers", and in the 1920s it was used to describe the works of Thorstein Veblen.

Early technocratic organisations formed after the First World War. These included Henry Gantt’s "The New Machine" and Veblen’s "Soviet of Technicians".  These organisations folded after a short time. Writers such as Henry Gantt, Thorstein Veblen, and Howard Scott suggested that businesspeople were incapable of reforming their industries in the public interest and that control of industry should thus be given to engineers.

United States and Canada

Howard Scott has been called the "founder of the technocracy movement" and he started the Technical Alliance in New York near the end of 1919. Members of the Alliance were mostly scientists and engineers. The Technical Alliance started an Energy Survey of North America, which aimed to provide a scientific background from which ideas about a new social structure could be developed. However the group broke up in 1921 before the survey was completed.

In 1932, Scott and others interested in the problems of technological growth and economic change began meeting in New York City. Their ideas gained national attention and the "Committee on Technocracy" was formed at Columbia University, by Howard Scott and Walter Rautenstrauch. However, the group was short-lived and in January 1933 splintered into two other groups, the "Continental Committee on Technocracy" (led by Harold Loeb) and "Technocracy Incorporated" (led by Scott). Smaller groups included the Technical Alliance, The New Machine and the Utopian Society of America, though Bellamy had the most success due to his nationalistic stances, and Veblen's rhetoric, removing the current pricing system and his blueprint for a national directorate to reorganize all produced goods and supply, and ultimately to radically increase all industrial output.

At the core of Scott's vision was "an energy theory of value". Since the basic measure common to the production of all goods and services was energy, he reasoned "that the sole scientific foundation for the monetary system was also energy", and that by using an energy metric instead of a monetary metric (energy certificates or 'energy accounting') a more efficient design of society could be made. Technocracy Inc. officials wore a uniform, consisting of a "well-tailored double-breasted suit, gray shirt, and blue necktie, with a monad insignia on the lapel", and its members saluted Scott in public.

Public interest in technocracy peaked in the early 1930s:
Technocracy's heyday lasted only from June 16, 1932, when the New York Times became the first influential press organ to report its activities, until January 13, 1933, when Scott, attempting to silence his critics, delivered what some critics called a confusing, and uninspiring address on a well-publicized nationwide radio hookup. 

Following Scott's radio address (Hotel Pierre Address), the condemnation of both him and technocracy in general reached a peak. The press and businesspeople reacted with ridicule and almost unanimous hostility. The American Engineering Council charged the technocrats with "unprofessional activity, questionable data, and drawing unwarranted conclusions". 
The technocrats made a believable case for a kind of technological utopia, but their asking price was too high. The idea of political democracy still represented a stronger ideal than technological elitism. In the end, critics believed that the socially desirable goals that technology made possible could be achieved without the sacrifice of existing institutions and values and without incurring the apocalypse that technocracy predicted.
The faction-ridden Continental Committee on Technocracy collapsed in October 1936.  However, Technocracy Incorporated continued.

On the 8 October 1940 the arrests have been made   by the Royal Canadian Mounted Police. The charges were for being a member of an illegal organisation Technocracy Incorporated. One of the arrested was Joshua Norman Haldeman, an amateur archaeologist, a former Regina chiropractor and former director of Technocracy Incorporated, the grandfather of Elon Musk.

There were some speaking tours of the US and Canada in 1946 and 1947, and a motorcade from Los Angeles to Vancouver:
Hundreds of cars, trucks, and trailers, all regulation grey, from all over the Pacific Northwest, participated. An old school bus, repainted and retrofitted with sleeping and office facilities, a two-way radio, and a public address system, impressed observers. A huge war surplus searchlight mounted on a truck bed was included, and grey-painted motorcycles acted as parade marshals. A small grey aircraft, with a Monad symbol on its wings, flew overhead. All this was recorded by the Technocrats on 16-mm 900-foot colour film.
1948 saw a decline in activity and considerable internal dissent. One central factor contributing to this dissent was that "the Price System had not collapsed, and predictions about the expected demise were becoming more and more vague". Some quite specific predictions about the price system collapse were made during the Great Depression, the first giving 1937 as the date, and the second forecasting the collapse as occurring "prior to 1940".

Membership and activity declined steadily in the years after 1948, but some activity persisted, mostly around Vancouver in Canada and on the West Coast of the United States. Technocracy Incorporated currently maintains a website and distributes a monthly newsletter and holds membership meetings.

An extensive archive of Technocracy's materials is held at the University of Alberta, in Canada.

Technocrats plan
In a publication from 1938 Technocracy Inc. the main organization made the following statement in defining their proposal.
Technocracy is the science of social engineering, the scientific operation of the entire social mechanism to produce and distribute goods and services to the entire population of this continent. For the first time in human history it will be done as a scientific, technical, engineering problem. There will be no place for Politics or Politicians, Finance or Financiers, Rackets or Racketeers. Technocracy states that this method of operating the social mechanism of the North American Continent is now mandatory because we have passed from a state of actual scarcity into the present status of potential abundance in which we are now held to an artificial scarcity forced upon us in order to continue a Price System which can distribute goods only by means of a medium of exchange. Technocracy states that price and abundance are incompatible; the greater the abundance the smaller the price. In a real abundance there can be no price at all. Only by abandoning the interfering price control and substituting a scientific method of production and distribution can an abundance be achieved. Technocracy will distribute by means of a certificate of distribution available to every citizen from birth to death. The Technate will encompass the entire American Continent from Panama to the North Pole because the natural resources and the natural boundary of this area make it an independent, self-sustaining geographical unit.

Calendar

The Technocratic movement planned to reform the work schedule, to achieve the goal of uninterrupted production, maximizing the efficiency and profitability of resources, transport and entertainment facilities, avoiding the "weekend effect".

According to the movement's calculations, it would be enough that every citizen worked a cycle of four consecutive days, four hours a day, followed by three days off. By "tiling" the days and working hours of seven groups, industry and services could be operated 24 hours a day, seven days a week. This system would include holiday periods allocated to each citizen.

Europe
In Germany before the Second World War, a technocratic movement based on the American model introduced by Technocracy Incorporated existed but ran afoul of the political system there.

There was also a Russian movement whose early history resembled the North American movement. The concept of Tectology developed by Alexander Bogdanov, perhaps the most important of the non-Leninist Bolsheviks, bears some semblance to technocratic ideas. Both Bogdanov's fiction and his political writings as presented by Zenovia Sochor, imply that he expected a coming revolution against capitalism to lead to a technocratic society.

References

External links 

 Official site
 David Adair (1970). [https://core.ac.uk/works/34613790 The Technocrats 1919-1967: A Case Study of Conflict and Change in a Social Movement] @ CORE (research service)
 
 

Technocracy movement
Schools of economic thought